Santeramo is a railway station in Santeramo in Colle, Italy. The station is located on the Rocchetta Sant'Antonio-Gioia del Colle railway. The train services are operated by Trenitalia.

Train services
The station is served by the following service(s):

Local services (Treno regionale) Gravina in Puglia - Altamura - Gioia del Colle - Taranto

Bus services

Rocchetta Sant'Antonio - Spinazzola - Gravina in Puglia - Altamura - Gioia del Colle

References

This article is based upon a translation of the Italian language version as at September 2014.

Railway stations in Apulia
Buildings and structures in the Province of Bari